Baron Dinevor, of Dinevor in the County of Carmarthen (usually spelt Dynevor or Dinefwr), is a title in the Peerage of Great Britain. It was created on 17 October 1780 for William Talbot, 1st Earl Talbot, with remainder to his daughter, Lady Cecil, wife of George Rice, a member of a prominent Welsh family. On Lord Talbot's death the earldom became extinct because he left no sons to succeed to it, while the barony of Talbot also held by him was inherited by his nephew. The barony of Dynevor passed according to the special remainder to his daughter, the second holder of the title. In 1787 Lady Dynevor (Cecil Rice) assumed by Royal licence the surname of de Cardonnel in lieu of Rice.

Her son, the third Baron, George Talbot Rice, represented Carmarthen in the House of Commons and served as Lord Lieutenant of Carmarthenshire. In 1793 he assumed by Royal licence the surname of de Cardonnel, but in 1817 he resumed by Royal licence the surname of Rice.  George Talbot Rice (Talbot-Rice) was succeeded by his son, the fourth Baron. He also sat as Member of Parliament for Carmarthen. In 1824, on inheriting the estates of the Trevor family of Glynde in Sussex, he assumed by Royal licence the additional surname of Trevor.

He was succeeded by his first cousin, the fifth Baron. He was the second son of the Very Reverend the Hon. Edward Rice, second son of the second Baroness. His grandson, the seventh Baron, represented Brighton in Parliament as a Conservative and served as Lord Lieutenant of Carmarthenshire. In 1916 he assumed by Royal licence for himself and his issue the surname of Rhys in lieu of Rice. His son, the eighth Baron, was a Conservative Member of Parliament for Romford and Guildford.  the title is held by his grandson, the tenth Baron, who succeeded in 2008.

The Rhys and Talbot Rice (Talbot-Rice) family can claim descent from the fifteenth century Rhys ap Thomas who had been granted extensive lands throughout west Wales as a reward for his leading role in the campaign that led to Henry VII's victory at the Battle of Bosworth in 1485. He or his men may even have delivered the fatal blow to Richard III.

Barons Dynevor
William Talbot, 1st Earl Talbot, 1st Baron Dynevor (1710–1782)
Cecil de Cardonnel, 2nd Baroness Dynevor (1735–1793)
George Talbot Rice, 3rd Baron Dynevor (1765–1852)
George Rice-Trevor, 4th Baron Dynevor (1795–1869)
Francis William Rice, 5th Baron Dynevor (1804–1878)
Arthur de Cardonnel FitzUryan Rice, 6th Baron Dynevor (1836–1911)
Walter FitzUryan Rice, 7th Baron Dynevor (1873–1956)
Charles Arthur Uryan Rhys, 8th Baron Dynevor (1899–1962)
Richard Charles Uryan Rhys, 9th Baron Dynevor (1935–2008)
Hugo Griffith Uryan Rhys, 10th Baron Dynevor (b. 1966)

The heir presumptive is the present holder's second cousin Robert David Arthur Rhys (b. 1963).
The heir presumptive's heir apparent is Robert's son Edward (b. 2002).

See also
 Dinefwr Castle

References

Attribution

Baronies in the Peerage of Great Britain
Carmarthenshire
Peerages created with special remainders
Noble titles created in 1780
Baron